Petravičius (masculine), Petravičienė (surname by husband), Petravičiūtė (maide name) is a Lithuanian-language surname. Notable people with this surname include:

Deimantas Petravičius (born 2 September 1995) is a Lithuanian footballer
Marijonas Petravičius (born October 24, 1979) is a Lithuanian retired professional basketball player
Pete Petravicius, pigeon racer

Lithuanian-language surnames